Nyctereutes (Greek: nyx, nykt- "night" + ereutēs "wanderer") is a genus of canid which includes only two extant species both known as raccoon dogs: the common raccoon dog (Nyctereutes procyonoides) and the Japanese raccoon dog (Nyctereutes viverrinus). Nyctereutes first entered the fossil record 5.5 million years ago (Mya) in northern China. It was one of the earliest canines to arrive in the Old World. All but two species became extinct before the Pleistocene. A study suggests that the evolution of Nyctereutes was influenced by environmental and climatic changes, such as the expansion and contraction of forests and the fluctuations of temperature and precipitation.

Characteristics
They are typically recognized by their short snouts, round crania and the shaping of their molars, specifically the ratio between M1 and M2. Nyctereutes is considered mainly an opportunistic carnivore, feeding on small mammals, fish, birds and insects, alongside occasional plants, specifically roots. Their diet is mostly influenced by environmental factors. Japanese raccoon dogs are considered distinct from the mainland species because of the larger skull size found in Russian and Hokkaido raccoon dogs.

Species

Extant species

Fossil species
†Nyctereutes abdeslami 3.6—1.8  Mya (Morocco)
†Nyctereutes donnezani 9.0—3.4 Mya (Eastern Europe, Spain)
†Nyctereutes lockwoodi 3.42—3.2 Mya (Ethiopia)
†Nyctereutes megamastoides (Europe)
†Nyctereutes sinensis 3.6 Mya—781,000 years ago (Eastern Asia)
†Nyctereutes tingi
†Nyctereutes vinetorum

References

Further reading
 

 
Vulpini
Mammal genera
Taxa named by Coenraad Jacob Temminck